Leonard Williams (born West Derby, Liverpool, Lancashire 1914 - died London 15 November 1962) was an English actor. He was best known for playing Sergeant Percy Twentyman on the police television series Z-Cars. According to Brian Blessed he was "the joker of the cast", who spent his time on set making his colleagues laugh.

Williams also played the characters of Theodore Craythorpe & Harry Whittle in the BBC radio comedy series The Clitheroe Kid. He also made regular appearances opposite Harry Worth on television. He died of a heart attack at his flat in Lexham Gardens, Kensington.   He was father to two children; Leon & Marianne, and was husband to Imelda.

Selected filmography
 The Magnet (1950)
 Orders Are Orders (1954)
 Make Me an Offer (1954)
 The Passing Stranger (1954)
 The Love Match (1955)
 Ramsbottom Rides Again (1955)
 Timeslip (1955)
 Behind the Headlines (1956)
 The Gay Dog (TV film) (1959)

References

External links

1914 births
1962 deaths
Male actors from Liverpool
English male film actors
English male television actors
20th-century English male actors